The 2016 Salford City Council election took place on 5 May 2016 to elect members of Salford City Council in England. This was on the same day as other local elections and the Salford Mayoral election. In April 2016, it was revealed that the Liberal Democrats would not be fielding any candidates in Salford.

This result had the following consequences for the total number of seats on the council after the elections:

Ward results
Asterisks denote incumbent Councillors seeking re-election.

Barton

Boothstown and Ellenbrook

Broughton

Cadishead

Claremont

Eccles

Irlam

Irwell Riverside

Kersal

There was a by-election held on 2 March 2017 following the resignation of the incumbent councillor. The ward was gained by the Conservative Party candidate, a local rabbi.

Langworthy

Little Hulton

Ordsall

Pendlebury

Swinton North

Swinton South

Walkden North

Walkden South

Weaste & Seedley

Winton

Worsley

References

2016 English local elections
2016
2010s in Greater Manchester